Armando Acosta Cordero, (November 15, 1920 in Taguasco – October 5, 2009 in Havana), known as Captain Erasmo Rodríguez, was a commander of the Cuban Rebel Army. From a very young age he participated in the struggle, with the Popular Socialist Party. He joined the Rebel Army in the Sierra Maestra and later joined Column 8 Ciro Redondo with which he contributed to liberate, different towns as well as his hometown.

Biography 
Armando was born on November 15, 1920 in the town of Taguasco (located in the current central province of Sancti Spíritus) .

Revolutionary Path 
From a very young age he participated in the struggle.  He was a labor leader in the Central Tuinicú, in Sancti Spíritus, and a commander of the Popular Socialist Party in the old province of Villa clara.

He joined the Rebel Army in the Sierra Maestra and later joined Column No. 8 Ciro Redondo, with which he participated in several combats under the command of Commander Ernesto Che Guevara helping to liberate, among others, his hometown.

Captain Erasmo Rodríguez 
At that time Armando Acosta was not known by this name, but by Captain Erasmo Rodríguez, a  war name by which he was identified, since his real na,e belonged to one of the fighters with more prominent communist ideas of the old Las Villas province. The rank of captain was obtained during the invasion campaign in Villareño territory.

Liberation of the city of Sancti Spíritus 
In Sancti Spíritus the rumor spread that Che Guevara and Camilo Cienfuegos accompanied by someone named Juana de Arcos, who wanted to avenge his family murdered by the dictatorship - they came to take the city. Commander Ernesto Che Guevara ordered Armando Acosta to harass Sancti Spíritus: "You throw a few shivers at the barracks and then you retreat." Commander Ernesto Che Guevara ordered Armando Acosta to shake Sancti Spíritus: “You throw a few shivers at the barracks and then you leave” .

Liberation of Jatibonico 
Days later, in late December 1958, while he was in Jatibonico carrying out the orders of the General Command, Captain Armando Acosta Cordero ―leader of Group No. 1 Platoon 6 of Column No. 8 Ciro Redondo―, and Lieutenant Güil (Wilfredo Alcaga) ordered the attack and the taking of Jatibonico.

Responsibilities 
With the victory of the Cuban Revolution, in January 1959 the revolutionary administration was established in Jatibonico . They inherited an area under the control of former regimes  since 1902 had directed the destinies of the territory, and it was nothing more than a reflection of the neocolonialist regime existing in Cuba.

Death 
He died in Havana on October 5, 2009, at the age of 88. At his will, his remains were cremated and his ashes were deposited in the Mausoleum of the Front of Las Villas, in the city of Santa Clara.

References 

Cuban military personnel
Cuban guerrillas
1920 births
2009 deaths